George Campbell Macaulay (6 August 1852 – 6 July 1915), also known as G. C. Macaulay, was a noted English classical scholar. His daughter  was the fiction writer Rose Macaulay.

Family
Macaulay was born on 6 August 1852, in Hodnet, Shropshire, England, the eldest son of Rev. Samuel Herrick Macaulay, who was a Rector in Hodnet. Their family descended, in the male-line, from the Macaulay family of Lewis. In 1878, George Campbell Macaulay married Grace Mary Conybeare, the daughter of Rev. W. J. Conybeare. Together the couple had two sons and four daughters. Their second child, Rose Macaulay (born 1881), an English author, was appointed as a DBE in 1958.

Education, career, later life

Macaulay was educated at Eton and Trinity College, Cambridge. Macaulay was also a Fellow of Trinity College, at Cambridge, and from 1878 to 1887 Assistant Master at Rugby School. From 1901 to 1907, he was Professor of English Language and Literature at University College of Wales, at Aberystwyth. In 1905, he lectured on English at Cambridge. Macaulay was the editor of the Modern English Review (English Department). For a time, he and his young family lived in Varezze, a fishing village in Italy, due to a female family member's poor health. He also resided at Southernwood, Great Shelford, Cambridgeshire, and died there on 6 July 1915.

Publications
Macaulay had a number of publications, of which the following can be freely read and downloaded at the Internet Archive.

 French Works
 first half of Confessio Amantis(to V.1970)
 second half of Confessio Amantis (from V.1970)
 Gower biography and Latin Works

Notes

References

Further reading

External links

1852 births
1915 deaths
People educated at Eton College
Alumni of Trinity College, Cambridge
George Campbell
English classical scholars
English people of Scottish descent
Writers from Shropshire
People from Great Shelford